is a soccer game released for the Game Boy and Family Computer that revolves around the J-League. There is an exhibition, a season mode, a playoff mode, and a practice mode. The object in the game is to win the championship so that the player's chosen team can be called the greatest team in all of Japan.

See also
 List of J. League licensed video games

External links
 J-League Winning Goal flyer at Giant Bomb
 J-League Winning Goal (Game Boy) at GameFAQs
 J-League Winning Goal (Family Computer) at GameFAQs

1994 video games
Association football video games
J.League licensed video games
Japan-exclusive video games
Electronic Arts games
Game Boy games
Nintendo Entertainment System games
Multiplayer and single-player video games
Victor Entertainment games
Video games developed in Japan